, also known as minor bupuleurum formula and xiǎocháihútāng (XCHT), is a herbal supplement, believed to enhance liver health. Sho-Saiko-To is a widely used prescription drug in China and is a listed formula in China and Japan as a Kampo medicine. There are currently ongoing clinical trials for Sho-Saiko-To at University of California, San Diego and Memorial Sloan-Kettering Cancer Center. The active ingredients of sho-saiko-to discovered so far include baicalin, baicalein, glycyrrhizin, saikosaponins, ginsenosides, wogonin, and gingerol.

As a Chinese patent medicine it is listed in the Pharmacopoeia of the People's Republic of China. One dried, soluble form lists chai-hu/saiko (dried bupleurum chinense or scorzonerifolium root), huangqin (dry Scutellaria baicalensis stem), banxia (Pinellia ternata), ginger, licorice, jujube, and Codonopsis pilosula as ingredients. This form is standardized to contain at least 20 mg baicalin per serving. Some formulae use ginseng instead of C. pilosula.

It is first recorded in Shanghan Lun circa 220 AD, indicated for "lesser yang". It has some antidepressant-like effects.

Sho-saiko-to has been studied, but the results in patients with hepatitis B were very low.

References

Further reading
New York Sloan-Kettering Cancer Center. "Sho-saiko-to".
Wen, Dan. "Sho-saiko-to, a Clinically Documented Herbal Preparation for Treating Chronic Liver Disease". HerbalGram: The Journal of the American Botanical Council, Issue: 73 Pages: 34–43, 2007.

Dietary supplements
Traditional Chinese medicine